The Pselaphitae are a supertribe of rove beetles.

Tribes
 Arhytodini
 Ceophyllini
 Pselaphini
 Tmesiphorini
 Tyrini
 Hybocephalini
 Attapeniini
 Pachygastrodini
 Odontalgini

Genera
These 13 genera belong to the supertribe Pselaphitae:
 Atinus Horn, 1868 i c g b
 Biotus Casey, 1887 i c g b
 Caccoplectus Sharp, 1887 i c g b
 Cedius LeConte, 1849 i c g b
 Ceophyllus LeConte, 1849 i c g b
 Ctenisis Raffray, 1890 i c g b
 Ctenisodes Raffray, 1897 i c g b
 Hamotus Aubé, 1844 i c g b
 Mipseltyrus Park, 1953 i c g b
 Pselaphus Herbst, 1792 i c g b
 Tmesiphorus LeConte, 1849 i c g b
 Tyrus Aubé, 1833 i c g b
 Upoluna Schaufuss, 1886 b
Data sources: i = ITIS, c = Catalogue of Life, g = GBIF, b = Bugguide.net

References

 
Supertribes